Gem is a hamlet in southern Alberta, Canada within the County of Newell.

Climate

Demographics 
The population of Gem according to the 2020 municipal census conducted by the County of Newell is 29.

See also 
List of communities in Alberta
List of hamlets in Alberta

References 

Hamlets in Alberta
County of Newell